Arthur Johnson may refer to:

Sports
Arthur Johnson (athletic director), athletic director for Temple Owls
Arthur Johnson (boxer) (born 1966), U.S. Olympic boxer
Arthur Johnson (rugby league), Widnes and Great Britain 1908/09 - 1922/23
Arthur Johnson (footballer, born 1879) (1879–?), Anglo-Irish footballer and manager in the 1910s and 1920s
Arthur Johnson (footballer, born 1886), English half back prior to the First World War
Arthur Johnson (footballer, born 1903) (1903–1987), English footballer in the 1920s and early 1930s
Arthur Johnson (footballer, born 1933), English goalkeeper in the 1950s and 1960s
Arthur Johnson (canoeist) (born 1921), Canadian Olympic canoer in the 1950s
Arthur Johnson (basketball) (born 1982), American basketball player
Art Johnson (racing driver) (1884–1949), racing driver
Art Johnson (1940s pitcher) (1919–2008), major league pitcher with the Boston Braves
Art Johnson (1920s pitcher) (1897–1982), major league pitcher with the New York Giants
Art Johnson (American football), American football player for 2011 Texas Longhorns football team

Others
Arthur V. Johnson (1876–1916), actor and director in American silent films
Arthur Johnson (historian) (1845–1927), English historian
Arthur Johnson (professor), Rawlinson and Bosworth Professor of Anglo-Saxon at the University of Oxford 1827–1829
Arthur Johnson (musician), drummer and original member of Boston rock band Come
Arthur Johnson, English watchmaker and originator of hybridisation of Hippeastrum 
Arthur L. Johnson (died 1955), educator in the U.S. state of New Jersey
Arthur M. Johnson, American historian, see Beveridge Award
Arthur Johnson (United States Army officer)

See also
Arthur Johnston (disambiguation)